The San Benito AVA is an American Viticultural Area located in San Benito County, California. It is part of the larger Central Coast AVA.  San Benito has a moderate climate with cooling breezes from the Pacific Ocean arriving via gaps between the Gabilan Range and the Santa Lucia Mountains.  The region was once the principal source of grapes for Almaden Vineyards before the business was acquired by Constellation Brands in 1984.

References

American Viticultural Areas
American Viticultural Areas of California
Geography of San Benito County, California
1987 establishments in California